Wesley Moraes Ferreira da Silva (born 24 November 1996), known as Wesley or Wesley Moraes, is a Brazilian professional footballer who plays as a centre forward for Segunda División club Levante, on loan from Premier League club Aston Villa.

He began his career at Brazilian side Itabuna before moving to Trenčín in the Slovak Super Liga and subsequently Club Brugge where he won two league titles and was named Belgian Young Professional Footballer of the Year in 2018. He made his international debut for Brazil in November 2019.

Club career

Youth career and Itabuna
As a youngster Moraes played futsal around his hometown of Juiz de Fora. Moving to football, he represented both Associação Esportiva Uberabinha and Sport Club Juiz de Fora for different periods. In 2013, he also spent three months at Atlético Mineiro, but was released; in that year, he also played for Tupi.

Having joined local side Itabuna at eighteen, Wesley played semi-professionally in the state level Campeonato Baiano in 2014, but stayed at the club for just three months. He later went on trial with European clubs including a lengthy six-month trial at Atlético Madrid's academy side where he played in tournaments in Bilbao and Croatia, and later a three-month trial at AS Nancy; neither club offered him a professional contract. Wesley also trialled with then Ligue 2 side Evian.

Trenčín
Wesley joined AS Trenčín of the Slovak Super Liga in July 2015, who had become aware of him after his trials in Europe. On 14 July 2015, he played for Trenčín against FCSB in the second round of qualification of the 2015–2016 Champions League. He scored twice for Trenčín in the return match against FCSB, helping his side to a 3–2 win but the club did not proceed to the next round.

Club Brugge
Wesley moved to Club Brugge on 29 January 2016. He scored his first goal in his debut match against KVC Westerlo. Brugges worked to tone down his aggression during games which led to a number of yellow cards and a sending off in his first season, he wore tape on his hands in a match against Royal Antwerp as a reminder to not react.

Aston Villa 
On 13 June 2019, Wesley signed for Aston Villa in the Premier League, for a fee of £22,000,000. Following a week-long training camp with the rest of the squad, Wesley made his debut for Villa in a friendly match against Minnesota United on 17 July 2019. Wesley scored his first Villa goal in his third appearance, opening the scoring in the 2–0 win over Everton on 23 August, with a first time strike beating Jordan Pickford.

On 1 January 2020, Wesley suffered a severe cruciate knee ligament injury after a tackle from Burnley's Ben Mee. Wesley had scored earlier in the game, a 2–1 win. His injury was initially predicted to take around nine months to recover from. However, the injury was more severe than first thought, and Wesley's time on the sidelines was much longer. He made his return to football on 26 March 2021, over a year later, playing for 45 minutes in a training ground friendly against West Bromwich Albion.

Wesley made his return to competitive football on 25 April 2021, 480 days since his last game, as a late substitute in a 2–2 Premier League draw against West Bromwich Albion.

Loans
On 28 August 2021, Wesley rejoined Club Brugge on a season-long loan. He made his second debut for Brugge on 18 September 2021, in a 1–0 victory over Charleroi.

On 7 January 2022, Wesley was recalled from his Club Brugge loan, and joined Brazilian club Internacional on a 12-month loan. On 29 January 2022, Wesley made his debut for Internacional - scoring a penalty in a 2–0 victory over Frederiquense in the Campeonato Gaúcho.

On 22 July 2022, Wesley was recalled from his Brazilian loan and moved on loan to Segunda División club Levante. He made his debut on 12 August 2022, in a 0–0 draw with Huesca.

International career
Wesley made his international debut for Brazil on 15 November 2019, coming off the bench in a 1–0 loss to Argentina.

Style of play
Wesley was born with one leg almost three centimetres shorter than the other, which has led to comparisons in his movement to legendary compatriot Garrincha. He was also compared with former Aston Villa striker Christian Benteke by Joseph Chapman from the Birmingham Mail, for his strong aerial threat while being confident with the ball at his feet.

Personal life
Wesley grew up in the city of Juiz de Fora, distant some 200 kilometres from Rio de Janeiro. His father was a footballer who played as a midfielder but only made a small amount of money from playing; Wesley credited his father as having taught him the game of football. His father became partially disabled later in his life and died following a brain tumour when Wesley was nine years of age.

Wesley has two children from different relationships, Yan and Maria Eduarda, both of whom he fathered as a teenager. He had his first child at the age of 14 and his second at the age of 16. As a sixteen-year-old he worked in a factory sorting screws to support his family between football trials before his move to AS Trencin.

Career statistics

Club

Honours
AS Trenčín
 Slovak League: 2015–16
 Slovak Cup: 2015–16

Club Brugge
 Belgian First Division A: 2015–16, 2017–18
 Belgian Super Cup: 2016, 2018

Individual
 Belgian Young Professional Footballer of the Year: 2017–18

References

External links

 
 Futbalnet profile
 AS Trenčín official website profile

1996 births
Living people
Association football forwards
Brazilian footballers
Brazilian expatriate footballers
AS Trenčín players
Club Brugge KV players
Slovak Super Liga players
Belgian Pro League players
Campeonato Brasileiro Série A players
Expatriate footballers in Slovakia
Expatriate footballers in Belgium
Expatriate footballers in Spain
Brazilian expatriate sportspeople in Slovakia
Brazilian expatriate sportspeople in Belgium
Brazilian expatriate sportspeople in Spain
People from Juiz de Fora
Expatriate footballers in England
Aston Villa F.C. players
Sport Club Internacional players
Brazilian expatriate sportspeople in England
Brazil international footballers
Sportspeople from Minas Gerais
Levante UD footballers
Segunda División players
Premier League players